Patamada Karambiah "P.K." Belliappa (24 March 1940 – 19 February 2020) was an Indian cricketer. He played in 94 first-class matches for Tamil Nadu from 1959 to 1974, scoring more than 4,000 runs and captaining the side. In January 1963, he scored 104 runs for South Zone against the Marylebone Cricket Club (MCC), during England's tour to India.

References

External links
 

1940 births
2020 deaths
Indian cricketers
South Zone cricketers
Tamil Nadu cricketers
Place of birth missing